Aemilia peropaca is a moth of the family Erebidae. It was described by Seitz in 1920. It is found in Colombia.

References

Moths described in 1920
Phaegopterina
Moths of South America